A Time for Burning is a 1966 American documentary film that explores the attempts of the minister of Augustana Lutheran Church in Omaha, Nebraska, to persuade his all-white congregation to reach out to "Negro" Lutherans in the city's north side. The film was directed by San Francisco filmmaker William C. Jersey and was nominated for Best Documentary Feature in the 1967 Academy Awards.  The film was commissioned by the Lutheran Church in America.

The film is shot in "cinéma vérité" style. It chronicles the relationship between the minister, L. William Youngdahl, and his white and black Lutheran parishioners. Youngdahl was the son of former Minnesota governor and federal judge Luther Youngdahl. The film includes a meeting between Youngdahl and a black barber, Ernie Chambers, who tells Youngdahl that his Jesus is "contaminated." At one point another Omaha Lutheran minister, Walter E. Rowoldt of Luther Memorial Lutheran Church, says, "This one lady said to me, 'pastor', she said, 'I want them to have everything I have, I want God to bless them as much as he blesses me, but', she says, 'pastor, I just can't be in the same room with them, it just bothers me'." Rowoldt and other ministers also discuss the concern that blacks moving into white neighborhoods will decrease property values.

The attempt to reach out does not succeed and Youngdahl resigns as minister of the church.

In 2005, A Time for Burning was selected for preservation in the United States National Film Registry by the Library of Congress as "culturally, historically, or aesthetically significant".

Chambers completed law school and was elected to the Nebraska Legislature in 1970. By 2005, he had become the longest-serving state senator in Nebraska history.

See also
 Civil rights movement in popular culture
 List of American films of 1966
 Timeline of riots and civil unrest in Omaha, Nebraska
 Racial Tension in Omaha, Nebraska

References

External links
A Time for Burning essay  by Ed Carter at National Film Registry
A Time for Burning essay by Daniel Eagan in   America's Film Legacy: The Authoritative Guide to the Landmark Movies in the National Film Registry, A&C Black, 2010 , pages 621-622

 Augustana Lutheran Church website
 

History of North Omaha, Nebraska
Christianity in Omaha, Nebraska
1966 films
Documentary films about the civil rights movement
United States National Film Registry films
American documentary films
Documentary films about racism in the United States
Documentary films about Christianity in the United States
Sponsored films
African-American history in Omaha, Nebraska
Ethnic groups in Omaha, Nebraska
Culture of Omaha, Nebraska
20th-century Lutheranism
1966 documentary films
1966 in Christianity
Documentary films about Nebraska
1960s English-language films
1960s American films